Turquoise & Crimson is a double-album released by the band VAST, their fourth album, released in 2006 under Jon Crosby's 2blossoms record label.  The two discs contain re-mastered tracks found on the online release of Turquoise & Crimson and the major-label release of Nude, albeit in different mixes and with different production.  The track listing is also different on the retail version than the official online version. Frontman Jon Crosby has said that the retail version is the official final version of the album.

The album also has its own specialized album art, different from the album art released for the Turquoise 3.x and Crimson 3.x releases, which each had their own album artwork.

Track listing
All songs written by Jon Crosby.

Disc 1
"Turquoise" – 3:19
"Ecstasy" – 3:29
"Be With Me" – 3:53
"Thrown Away" – 4:00
"Don't Take Your Love Away" – 4:53
"Falling from the Sky" – 3:05
"Candle" – 4:01
"I Woke Up L.A." – 3:30
"I Can't Say No (To You)" – 4:12
"Desert Garden" – 3:17

Disc 2
"Dead Angels" – 3:25
"I Need to Say Goodbye" – 3:23
"Lost" – 2:37
"Winter in My Heart" – 3:36
"All I Found Was You (Japanese Fantasy)" – 3:25
"That's My Boy" – 3:54
"Evil Little Girl" – 3:59
"Beautiful" – 3:33
"Señorita" – 2:50
"Where It Never Rains" – 3:30
"Bruise" – 3:17
"Goodbye" – 3:04

Reception

AllMusic noted the shift in tone since VAST was no longer on a major label, giving the album a 3 out of 5 and calling it "essential for VAST fans", but noting that its largest problem was Crosby's vocal style.

References

VAST albums
2006 albums